Girls in Prison is a 1994 American television film directed by John McNaughton. Girls in Prison originally aired on the cable television network Showtime in 1994 as part of the series Rebel Highway.

Plot
A young aspiring singer is sent to prison after getting wrongly convicted of murdering a record company president in 1950s Hollywood. With the help of two other convicts whose backstories we see previously, she must survive as the real culprits send "hit girls" to kill her inside. One of these convicts connects her to a private investigator who tracks the culprits down, but the murderer has determined to silence her.

Cast
 Diane McGee as Mrs. Felton
 Harvey Chao as Liam Fong
 Bahni Turpin as Melba
 Ralph Meyering Jr. as Jim Jeffrey
 Letitia Hicks as Receptionist
 Ione Skye as Carol Madison
 J. Patrick McCormack as Gordon Madison
 William C. Clark as Actor Playing McCarthy
 William Boyett as Dr. Shainmark
 David Paul Needles as McCarthy on Newsreel
 Tamara Clatterbuck as Actress on Newsreel
 Missy Crider as Aggie O'Hanlon
 Jon Polito as Boss Johnson
 Anne Heche as Jennifer
 Angie Rae McKinney as Miranda
 Raymond O'Connor as Mickey Maven

References

External links 

1994 television films
1994 films
American television films
1990s English-language films
Films directed by John McNaughton
Films scored by Hummie Mann
Rebel Highway
Women in prison films
Films set in the 1950s
Films produced by Debra Hill